VA-2 may refer to:

 Virginia State Route 2
 Virginia's 2nd congressional district